The 2001 Rally GB (formally the 57th Network Q Rally of Great Britain) was the fourteenth and final round of the 2001 World Rally Championship. The race was held over four days between 22 November and 25 November 2001, and was won by Peugeot's Marcus Grönholm, his 7th win in the World Rally Championship.

Background

Entry list

Itinerary
All dates and times are GMT (UTC±0).

Results

Overall

World Rally Cars

Classification

Special stages

Championship standings
Bold text indicates 2001 World Champions.

FIA Cup for Production Rally Drivers

Classification

Special stages

Championship standings
Bold text indicates 2001 World Champions.

FIA Cup for Super 1600 Drivers

Classification

Special stages

Championship standings
Bold text indicates 2001 World Champions.

References

External links 
 Official website of the World Rally Championship

Rally GB
2001 Rally GB
Rally GB